Alf Crump (7 August 1922 – 2 May 1979) was an Australian rules footballer who played for the North Melbourne Football Club in the Victorian Football League (VFL).

Notes

External links 
		

1922 births
1979 deaths
Australian rules footballers from Victoria (Australia)
North Melbourne Football Club players